Sokółki  (from 1938-45 Halldorf) is a village in the administrative district of Gmina Kowale Oleckie, within Olecko County, Warmian-Masurian Voivodeship, in northern Poland. 

The village has a population of 250.

References

Villages in Olecko County